The Papal Basilica of Saint Paul Outside the Walls , commonly known as Saint Paul's Outside the Walls, is one of Rome's four major papal basilicas, along with the basilicas of Saint John in the Lateran, Saint Peter's, and Saint Mary Major, as well as one of the Seven Pilgrim Churches of Rome.

The Basilica is within Italian territory, but the Holy See owns the Basilica in a regime of extraterritoriality, with Italy recognizing its full ownership and conceding it "the immunity granted by international law to the headquarters of the diplomatic agents of foreign States".

James Michael Harvey was named Archpriest of the basilica in 2012.

History
The basilica was founded by the Roman Emperor Constantine I over the burial place of Paul of Tarsus, where it was said that, after the apostle's execution, his followers erected a memorial, called a cella memoriae. This first basilica was consecrated by Pope Sylvester in 324.

In 386, Emperor Theodosius I began erecting a much larger and more beautiful basilica with a nave and four aisles with a transept.  It was probably consecrated around 402 by Pope Innocent I. The work, including the mosaics, was not completed until Leo I's pontificate (440–461). In the 5th century, it was larger than the Old Saint Peter's Basilica. The Christian poet Prudentius, who saw it at the time of emperor Honorius (395–423), describes the splendours of the monument in a few expressive lines.

Under Leo I, extensive repair work was carried out following the collapse of the roof on account of fire or lightning. In particular, the transept (i.e. the area around Paul's tomb) was elevated and a new main altar and presbytery were installed. This was probably the first time that an altar was placed over the tomb of Saint Paul, which remained untouched, but largely underground given Leo's newly elevated floor levels. Leo was also responsible for fixing the triumphal arch and for restoring a fountain in the courtyard (atrium). 

Under Pope Gregory the Great (590–604), the main altar and presbytery were extensively modified. The pavement in the transept was raised and a new altar was placed above the earlier altar erected by Leo I. The position was directly over Saint Paul's sarcophagus. 

In that period, there were two monasteries near the basilica: Saint Aristus's for men and Saint Stefano's for women. Masses were celebrated by a special body of clerics instituted by Pope Simplicius. Over time, the monasteries and the basilica's clergy declined; Pope Gregory II restored the former and entrusted the monks with the basilica's care.

As it lay outside the Aurelian Walls, the basilica was damaged in the 9th century during a Saracen raid. Consequently, Pope John VIII (872–82) fortified the basilica, the monastery, and the dwellings of the peasantry, forming the town of Johannispolis (Italian: Giovannipoli) which existed until 1348, when an earthquake totally destroyed it.

In 937, when Odo of Cluny came to Rome, Alberic II of Spoleto, Patrician of Rome, entrusted the monastery and basilica to his congregation and Odo placed Balduino of Monte Cassino in charge. Pope Gregory VII was abbot of the monastery and in his time Pantaleone, a rich merchant of Amalfi who lived in Constantinople, presented the bronze doors of the basilica maior, which were executed by Constantinopolitan artists; the doors are inscribed with Pantaleone's prayer that the "doors of life" may be opened to him. Pope Martin V entrusted it to the monks of the Congregation of Monte Cassino. It was then made an abbey nullius. The abbot's jurisdiction extended over the districts of Civitella San Paolo, Leprignano, and Nazzano, all of which formed parishes.
 The graceful cloister of the monastery was erected between 1220 and 1241.

From 1215 until 1964, it was the seat of the Latin Patriarch of Alexandria.

Pope Benedict XIV undertook the restoration of the apse mosaic and the frescoes of the central nave, and commissioned the painter Salvatore Manosilio to continue the series of papal portraits, which at that time ended with Pope Vitalian, who had reigned over a millennium earlier.

On 15 July 1823, a workman repairing the copper gutters of the roof started a fire that led to the near-total destruction of this basilica, which, alone among all the churches of Rome, had preserved much of its original character for 1435 years. Marble salvaged from the burnt-out Saint Paul's was re-laid for the floor of Santo Stefano del Cacco.

In 1825, Leo XII issued the encyclical Ad plurimas encouraging donations for the reconstruction. A few months later, he issued orders that the basilica be rebuilt exactly as it had been when new in the fourth century, though he also stipulated that precious elements from later periods, such as the medieval mosaics and tabernacle, also be repaired and retained. These guidelines proved unrealistic for a variety of reasons and soon ceased to be enforced. The result is a reconstructed basilica that bears only a general resemblance to the original and is by no means identical to it. The reconstruction was initially entrusted to the architect Pasquale Belli, who was succeeded upon his death in 1833 by Luigi Poletti, who supervised the project until his death in 1869 and was responsible for the lion's share of the work. Many elements which had survived the fire were reused in the reconstruction. Many foreign rulers also made contributions. Muhammad Ali Pasha, Viceroy of Egypt gave columns of alabaster, while the Emperor of Russia donated precious malachite and lapis lazuli that was used on some of the altar fronts. The transept and high altar were consecrated in 1840 and that part of the basilica was then re-opened. The entire building was reconsecrated in 1854 in the presence of Pope Pius IX and fifty cardinals. Many features of the building were still be to executed at that date, however, and work ultimately extended into the twentieth century. The quadriporticus looking toward the Tiber was completed by the Italian Government, which declared the church a national monument. On 23 April 1891, an explosion at the gunpowder magazine at Forte Portuense destroyed the basilica's stained glass windows.

On 31 May 2005, Pope Benedict XVI ordered the basilica to come under the control of an archpriest and he named Archbishop Andrea Cordero Lanza di Montezemolo as its first archpriest.

Architecture and interior

The covered portico (or narthex) that precedes the façade is a Neo-classicist addition of the 19th-century reconstruction. On the right is the Holy Door, which is opened only during the Jubilees. On the inside is a second door, known as the Byzantine door, which was present in the pre-19th century basilica; it contains on one side 56 small square engraved bronze panels, and was commissioned in 1070 by Pantaleone, Consul of Amalfi in Constantinople, and putatively cast in Constantinople. It depicts a number of episodes in the life of Christ and the apostles.  

The new basilica has maintained the original structure with one nave and four side aisles.
and -high, the second largest in Rome.

The nave's 80 columns and its wood and stucco-decorated ceiling are from the 19th century. All that remains of the ancient basilica are the interior portion of the apse with the triumphal arch. The mosaics of the apse were greatly damaged in the 1823 fire; only a few traces were incorporated in the restoration. The 5th-century mosaics of the triumphal arch are original (but also heavily reworked): an inscription in the lower section attest they were done at the time of Leo I, paid by Galla Placidia. The subject portrays the Apocalypse of John, with the bust of Christ in the middle flanked by the 24 Doctors of the Church, surmounted by the flying symbols of the four Evangelists. Saint Peter and Saint Paul are portrayed at the right and left of the arch, the latter pointing downwards (probably to his tomb).

From the inside, the windows may appear to be stained glass, but they are actually translucent alabaster.

The tabernacle of the confession of Arnolfo di Cambio (1285) belongs to the 13th century.

In the old basilica each pope had his portrait in a painted frieze extending above the columns separating the aisles from the nave. A 19th-century mosaic version can be seen now. The nave's interior walls were also redecorated with painted scenes from Saint Paul's life placed between the windows of the clerestory.

South of the transept is the cloister, considered "one of the most beautiful of the Middle Ages". Built by Vassalletto in 1205–1241, it has double columns of different shapes. Some columns have inlays with golden and colored-glass mosaics; the same decoration can be seen on the architrave and the inner frame of the cloister. Also visible are fragments from the destroyed basilica and ancient sarcophagi, one with scenes of the myth of Apollo.

Tomb of Saint Paul

According to tradition, Saint Paul's body was buried two miles away from the location of his martyrdom, in the sepulchral area along the Ostiense Way, which was owned by a Christian woman named Lucina. A tropaeum was erected on it and quickly became a place of veneration.

Constantine I erected a basilica on the tropaeum's site, and the basilica was significantly extended by Theodosius I from 386, into what is now known as Saint Paul Outside the Walls. During the 4th century, Paul's remains, excluding the head, were moved into a sarcophagus. (According to church tradition the head rests at the Lateran.) The tombstone bears the Latin inscription  ("to Paul the apostle and martyr"). The inscribed portion of the tombstone has three holes, two square and one circular. The circular hole is connected to the tomb by a pipeline, reflecting the Roman custom of pouring perfumes inside the sarcophagus, or to the practice of providing the bones of the dead with libations.

The discovery of the sarcophagus is mentioned in the chronicle of the Benedictine monastery attached to the basilica, in regard to the 19th century rebuilding. Unlike other sarcophagi found at that time, this was not mentioned in the excavation papers.

On 6 December 2006, it was announced that Vatican archaeologists had confirmed the presence of a white marble sarcophagus beneath the altar, perhaps containing the remains of the Apostle. A press conference held on 11 December 2006 gave more details of the work of excavation, which lasted from 2002 to 22 September 2006, and which had been initiated after pilgrims to the basilica expressed disappointment that the Apostle's tomb could not be visited or touched during the Jubilee year of 2000. The sarcophagus was not extracted from its position, so that only one of its two longer sides is visible. In 2009 the Pope announced that radiocarbon dating confirmed that the bones in the tomb date from the 1st or 2nd century suggesting that they are indeed Paul's.

A curved line of bricks indicating the outline of the apse of the Constantinian basilica was discovered immediately to the west of the sarcophagus, showing that the original basilica had its entrance to the east, like Saint Peter's Basilica in the Vatican. The larger 386 basilica that replaced it had the Via Ostiense (the road to Ostia) to the east and so was extended westward, towards the river Tiber, changing the orientation diametrically.

Abbots

The complex includes an ancient Benedictine Abbey, restored by Odo of Cluny in 936.
 1796–1799 Giovanni Battista Gualengo
 1799–1799 Giustino Nuzi
 1800–1800 Giovanni B. Gualengo
 1803–1806 Stefano Alessandri
 1806–1810 Giuseppe Giustino di Costanzo
 1810–1815 Stefano Alessandri
 1815–1821 Francesco Cavalli
 1821–1825 Adeodato Galeffi
 1825–1831 Giovanni Francesco Zelli
 1831–1838 Vincenzo Bini
 1838–1844 Giovanni Francesco Zelli
 1844–1850 Paolo Theodoli
 1850–1853 Mariano Falcinelli-Antoniacci
 1853–1858 Simplicio Pappalettere
 1858–1867 Angelo Pescetelli
 1867–1895 Leopoldo Zelli Jacobuzi
 1895–1904 Bonifacio Oslaender
 1904–1918 Giovanni del Papa
 1918–1929 Alfredo Ildefonso Schuster
 1929–1955 Ildebrando Vannucci
 1955–1964 Cesario D'Amato
 1964–1973 Giovanni Battista Franzoni
 1973–1980 Position empty
 1980–1988 Giuseppe Nardin
 1988–1996 Luca Collino
 1996–1997 Position empty
 1997–2005 Paolo Lunardon
 2005–2015 Edmund Power
 2015–2020 Roberto Dotta
 2020-present Sede vacante; overseen by an appointed Papal Administrator, Arrigo Miglio

Archpriests
 Cardinal Andrea Cordero Lanza di Montezemolo (31 May 2005 – 3 July 2009)
 Cardinal Francesco Monterisi (3 July 2009 – 23 November 2012)
 Cardinal James Michael Harvey (23 November 2012 – )

Other burials
 Thibaud of Ostia

Gallery

See also
 Bible of San Paolo fuori le Mura
 Leonine Wall, first wall around Vatican City
 List of Greco-Roman roofs

Notes

References

Further reading
 Nicola Camerlenghi, St. Paul's Outside the Walls: A Roman Basilica from Antiquity to the Modern Era (Cambridge University Press, 2018).
 Weitzmann, Kurt, ed., Age of spirituality: late antique and early Christian art, third to seventh century, no. 439–440, 1979, Metropolitan Museum of Art, New York, 
  
 
 Marina Docci, San Paolo fuori le mura: Dalle origini alla basilica delle origini (Roma: Gangemi Editore 2006).

External links
 The Papal Basilica St Paul Outside-the-Walls, official site.
 St. Paul's Outside the Walls: A Virtual Basilica
 
 St. Paul's Tomb Unearthed in Rome on National Geographic News, including a photograph of a side of the sarcophagus.
 The tombs of the apostles: Saint Paul
 Reliquary of St. Anne's forearm venerated in a side chapel

Roman Catholic churches completed in 1823
Paolo fuori le mura, San
World Heritage Sites in Italy
4th-century churches
Rome Q. X Ostiense
Tombs of apostles
Major basilicas